The  was a major Japanese political party that existed from 1945 to 1996.

Japan Socialist Party may also refer to:

Current political parties 
 , a political party established in 1996

Historical political parties 
 , a political party that existed from 1948 to 1955 after a split in the Japan Socialist Party
 , a political party that existed from 1948 to 1955 after a split in the Japan Socialist Party
 Democratic Socialist Party (Japan), a political party that existed from 1960 to 1994
 , a political party that existed from 1906 to 1907
 , a political party that existed from 1926 to 1928
  a political party that existed from 1926 to 1928
 , a political party that existed from 1932 to 1940
 , a political party that existed for nine months in 1937

See also 
 Social Democratic Party (Japan) (disambiguation)